Eileen Tell (born December 1, 1966) is an American former tennis player. She won a gold medal in doubles at the 1985 Maccabiah Games in Israel.

Biography

The daughter of a physicist, Tell grew up in Aberdeen Township, New Jersey and attended Matawan Regional High School. 

While competing on the professional tour she reached a best singles world ranking of around 120, with wins in WTA Tour tournaments over Camille Benjamin and Lucia Romanov. She was a main draw qualifier for the 1985 French Open, losing in the first round to Katerina Maleeva.

Tell played an unusual match against Steffi Graf at the 1984 North American Open in Livingston, where after getting to match point against the West German decided to forfeit, as she wouldn't have been able to play on in the tournament due to a clash with the U.S. Clay Court Championships. The clay court event in Indianapolis was more beneficial in terms of ranking points (she fell in qualifying).

She won a gold medal in doubles, playing with Ronni Reis, at the 1985 Maccabiah Games in Israel.

Following her brief time on tour, Tell went to the University of Texas on a tennis scholarship, but gave up on varsity tennis and in 1988 completed a bachelor's degree, double majoring in economics and math.

References

External links
 
 

1966 births
Living people
American female tennis players
Tennis people from New Jersey
Matawan Regional High School alumni
University of Texas alumni
People from Aberdeen Township, New Jersey
Sportspeople from Monmouth County, New Jersey
Jewish tennis players
Jewish American sportspeople
Maccabiah Games gold medalists for the United States
Competitors at the 1985 Maccabiah Games
Maccabiah Games medalists in tennis